Romulo Galicano (born February 4, 1945, in Carcar Cebu) is a Filipino painter whose works  are technically academic and philosophical in approach. His works are hauntingly reminiscent of the old Filipino Masters with modern sensibilities. He has mounted numerous one man shows and won various awards. He was on the board of judges for several competitions like in PLDT-DPC Telephone cover 8th visual art national and UST on-the-spot painting competition.

Life and career 

Education

Born to a family of artists, Galicano studied painting under his uncle, the Cebuano realist master Martino Abellana from 1961–1965 . In 1965 Galicano arrived in Manila and took up fine arts at the University of the East where he apprenticed under abstract painter Florencio Concepcion who taught him abstract design. Galicano trained further under Sofronio Y. Mendoza. In 1968 he began full-time studies in painting, afterwards he started painting together with the Dimasalang group during 1969–1975.

Affiliations

Dimasalang Art Group Taza de Oro
Group of Artist Art Association of the Philippines 1975 Sigliwa Group
2001 American Society of Portrait Artists
2004 Portrait Society of America
2010 Honorary member of PAC (Pasig Art Club)

Awards and achievements 

2010 – Awarded First Artist of the Year GSIS Museo ng Sining
2008 – Parangal Patnubay ng Sining at Kalinangan 437 Araw ng Maynila
2005 – Grand Prize Award International Portrait Competition Portrait Society of America, Washington D.C.
2005 – Plaque of Recognition For Outstanding Achievements in the Field of Arts and Culture For Carcar Academy, Carcar Cebu
2005 – Plaque of Recognition Garbo sa Sugbu, Governor's Night 436 years Anniversary for the province of Cebu
2005 – Plaque of Recognition in the Field of Art Municipality of Carcar Cebu
2005 – First Congressional Awards in the Field of Arts, 1st District of Cebu
2004 – Awards of Merit International Portrait Competition, Portrait Society of America, Boston Massachusetts
2004 – Appointed Honorary National Vice President for the PhilippinesBy: Ordine Accadimico Internazionale Vinzaglio, Italy
2003 – Plaque of Recognition for exemplary achievements in the Field of Paintings S.C.C. Night Carcar Cebu
1999 – 12th Perlas Award on the Valuable Filipino, Cebu City
1998 – Awarded the Highest Title of Ordinary Accademician (Department: Arts) By: Accademia Internazionale – Greci Marino Accademia Del Verbano, Italy
1998 – Awarded the Highest Title of Accademical knight for the Grand Cross (Department: Arts) By: Ordine Accadimico Internazionale Vinzaglio, Italy
1994 – 3rd Prize 1st Philip Morris Art Competition

Art exhibits 

1972 ⎯ 1st One Man Show – Hidalgo Gallery, Makati
1973 ⎯ 2nd One Man Show – Gallery One, San Juan
1974 ⎯ 3rd One Man Show – Gallery One, San Juan
1975 ⎯ 4th One Man Show – Gallery One, San Juan
1976 ⎯ 5th One Man Show – ABC Galleries, Manila
1979 ⎯ 6th One Man Show – ABC Galleries, Manila
1980 ⎯ 7th One Man Show – Ali Mall, Quezon City
1981 ⎯ 8th One Man Show – Gallery Bleue, Makati
1982 ⎯ 9th One Man Show – Ali Mall, Quezon City
1982 ⎯ 10th One Man Show – Hidalgo Gallery, Makati
1990 ⎯ 11th One Man Show – Osmeña Museum, Cebu
1991 ⎯ 12th One Man Show – Finale Gallery, Makati
1994 ⎯ 13th One Man Show – SM Art Center, Cebu
1994 ⎯ 14th One Man Show – Ayala Museum, Makati
2000 ⎯ 15th One Man Show – SM Mega Mall Art Center, Quezon City
2000 ⎯ 16th One Man Show – SM Art Center, Cebu
2008 ⎯ 17th One Man Show – Metropolitan Museum, Manila
2008 ⎯ 18th One Man Show – SM Art Center, Cebu
2011 ⎯ 19th One Man Show – Siete de Agosto: Allegory of a Farce – Tall Gallery, Finale Art File

Group Shows

Several major group shows including Ako, self-portrait from the 1800 to the Present at the Metropolitan Museum of Manila, 1995
World Trade Center Singapore Asean Art Competition, 1994
Tapestry of the Filipino Soul, Group painting exhibition by Ten outstanding Filipino artists, Galerie E, Hong Kong, 2001
Homage to the Master with Kitkat, Glorietta Art Center, Makati, 2001
Homage to the Master 2, Metropolitan Museum, Makati, 2002
Ode to the Pasig River, Ayala Museum, Makati, 2006
Contemporary Filipino Impressionists, The Edge Gallery, UP Vargas Museum, 2007
"Postura", Painting by Romulo Galicano, and Dolls by Patis Tesoro, Metropolitan Museum, 2008
"Postura", Painting by Romulo Galicano, and Dolls by Patis Tesoro, SM Cebu, 2008
Artlink Cebu – Manila Artists Group Exhibit Casino Español, Cebu City, 2008
Dimasalang Artists Celebrating 40 Years, SM Megamall Art Center, 2009
Cebu Art Festival, SM Cebu City, 2010
Bag-ong HInan-aw (The New Perspective) Group Art Exhibit, SM Cebu City, 2010
Re-collect: Revisiting The Metropolitan Museum Collection Tall Galleries, Oct. 9, 2009 – April 24, 2010
Altromondo Group Show, Arte Contemporaneo, 2010
NCCA – "Sinang Pasig" Bagong Pananaw, 2010
"Pasinaya" Alay sa Mutya Artistree Gallery, 2011

References

Bibliography
http://romulogalicano.com/biography.html.Romulo Galicano .2011. Romulo Galicano. Ink Elephant Studio. Retrieved 2015

External links
Biography

1945 births
Living people
People from Carcar
Filipino painters
University of the East alumni
Artists from Cebu